The Washington Gift of Life Award (formerly the Washington Gift of Life Medal) is one of three statutory civilian decorations and awards issued by the state of Washington, the others being the Washington Medal of Merit and the Washington Medal of Valor. Washington law does not describe an order of precedence for state decorations, though the Washington Gift of Life Award is generally considered inferior to the Medal of Valor and Medal of Merit.

Created by an act of the Washington Legislature in 1998, the Washington Gift of Life Award is given posthumously to individuals whose organ donation has saved the life of another person. The award is presented in certificate form to surviving family members of the deceased recipient. Awards are issued by the Governor of Washington on the nomination of a U.S. Department of Health designated organ procurement organization serving the state of Washington (essentially Pacific Northwest Transplant Bank and LifeCenter Northwest). The authorizing legislation allows the award to be granted six times annually.

See also
 Awards and Decorations of the Washington National Guard
 Washington Law Enforcement Medal of Honor

References

Awards established in 1998
Decorations and medals of Washington (state)